Henry Kelly is an Irish TV presenter.

Henry Kelly may also refer to:

 Henry Kelly (cricketer) (1898-1983), South African cricketer
 Henry Kelly (VC) (1897–1960), English recipient of the Victoria Cross
 Henry A. Kelly (born 1934), professor of English at the University of California, Los Angeles

See also
Harry Kelly (disambiguation)